This is a list of the members of the Dewan Rakyat (House of Representatives) of the 12th Parliament of Malaysia, elected in 2008.

Composition

<onlyinclude>

Seating arrangement
This is the seating arrangement as of its last meeting on 29 November 2012. In addition, there were a seat that is labelled as VACANT, namely Titiwangsa. The seats vacancy is due to the death of the incumbent Member of Parliament (MP) for the constituency, which happened on 17 July 2011 respectively.

Elected members by state 


Unless noted otherwise, the MPs served the entire term of the parliament (from 28 April 2008 until 3 April 2013).

Perlis

Kedah

Kelantan

Terengganu

Penang

Perak

Pahang

Selangor

Federal Territory of Kuala Lumpur

Federal Territory of Putrajaya

Negeri Sembilan

Malacca

Johor

Federal Territory of Labuan

Sabah

Sarawak

Notes

References 

12th Parliament of Malaysia
Lists of members of the Dewan Rakyat